A Review of the Times– Traditional Chinese: 萬國公報; Simplified Chinese: 万国公报; Pinyin: Wàn Guó Gōng Bào; Wade–Giles: Wan Kuo Kung Pao; Literally: "The Ten Thousand Nations' Common Newspaper") A Review of the Times was a monthly publication in China from 1868–1907. It was founded and edited by the American Methodist missionary the Reverend Young John Allen (林樂知) of Georgia. Its subject matter ranged from discussions on the politics of Western nation-states to the virtues and advantages of Christianity.

It attracted a wide and influential Chinese readership throughout its thirty-nine-year run from 1868 to 1907. The Qing reformer Kang Youwei (康有為) once said of the publication: "I owe my conversion to reform chiefly on the writings of two missionaries, the Rev. Timothy Richard and the Rev. Dr. Young J. Allen."

The other name under which the Rev. Allen published the paper was Kiao Hwei Sing Pao from 1868–1874.

A Chinese translation of Looking Backward was serialized in this magazine in 1891–1892.

References-

Newspapers established in 1868
Defunct newspapers published in China
Publications disestablished in 1907
1868 establishments in China
1907 disestablishments in China